Dzików may refer to the following places in Poland:
Dzików, Tarnobrzeg, a district of the town of Tarnobrzeg, Subcarpathian Voivodeship (SE Poland)
Dzików, Lower Silesian Voivodeship (south-west Poland)
Dzików, Pomeranian Voivodeship (north Poland)